Sunset High School is the name of several high schools in the United States:

Sunset High School (Crescent City, California)
Sunset High School (Encinitas, California)
Sunset High School (Hayward, California)
Sunset High School (Sunset, Louisiana), listed on the National Register of Historic Places
Sunset High School (Las Vegas, Nevada)
Sunset High School (Beaverton, Oregon)
Sunset High School (Dallas, Texas)
Sunset High School (El Paso, Texas), former high school in the El Paso Independent School District
Sunset High School (San Antonio, Texas)

See also
Miami Sunset High School, Miami, Florida
Royal Sunset High School, Hayward, California